The 2014–15 FC Zbrojovka Brno season is the club's 21st season in the Czech First League. The team is competing in Czech First League and the Czech Cup.

First team squad
.

In affiliated clubs 
.

Out on loan 

.

Competitions

Overview

Czech First League

Results summary

Results by round

League table

Results

Czech Cup

Results

External links
 Official team website 
 Website of the team FC Zbrojovka Brno – year-class '98

References

FC Zbrojovka Brno seasons	
Brno